Uklana Assembly constituency is a reserved constituency in Hisar district. It is one of the 90 Haryana constituencies of Haryana state in northern India.

It is part of Hisar Lok Sabha constituency.

Election results

2014-2019
Anoop Dhanak of Indian National Lok Dal won the 2014 Haryana Legislative Assembly election on 19 October 2014.

External links
 Chief Election Officer, Haryana

See also

 Haryana Legislative Assembly
 Elections in Haryana
 Elections in India
 Lok Sabha
 Rajya Sabha
 Election Commission of India

References

Assembly constituencies of Haryana
Hisar district